Fletcher is an unincorporated community located in Lewis County, Idaho, United States.

History
Fletcher's population was estimated at 100 in 1909.

References

Unincorporated communities in Lewis County, Idaho
Unincorporated communities in Idaho